The Roar of Jefferson Airplane is a compilation of songs by San Francisco rock band Jefferson Airplane without the ubiquitous "White Rabbit". "The Ballad of You and Me and Pooneil" is followed immediately by "The House at Pooneil Corners", thus making a suite from the two similar and related songs originally released on separate albums.

Track listing
"It's No Secret" – 2:38
"Go to Her" – 4:00
"Greasy Heart" – 3:25
"The Ballad of You and Me and Pooneil" – 4:29
"The House at Pooneil Corners" – 5:51
"Plastic Fantastic Lover" – 2:37
"Somebody to Love" – 2:57
"3/5 of a Mile in 10 Seconds" (live) – 4:50
"Long John Silver" – 4:22
"Feel So Good" – 4:36
"The Last Wall of the Castle" – 2:44
"Eat Starch Mom" – 4:34
"Volunteers" – 2:02
"The Other Side of This Life" (live) – 5:13

Personnel 
 Grace Slick – vocals, piano 
 Marty Balin – vocals, percussion  
 Paul Kantner – rhythm guitar, vocals 
 Jorma Kaukonen – lead guitar, vocals 
 Jack Casady – bass 
 Spencer Dryden – drums, percussion 
 Signe Toly Anderson – vocals on "It's No Secret" and "Go to Her"
 Skip Spence – drums on "It's No Secret" and "Go to Her"
 Joey Covington – drums on "Feel So Good" 
 John Barbata – drums on "Long John Silver" and "Eat Starch Mom"

Additional personnel
 Nicky Hopkins – piano on "Volunteers"

 

Jefferson Airplane compilation albums
2001 compilation albums
RCA Records compilation albums